Slavery on Sinan County's salt farms relates to the discovery of human trafficking cases in Sinan County (신안군), Jeollanam-do (전라남도), South Korea in 2014. It was discovered that individuals, mostly the homeless, were kidnapped and sent to salt farms to work without any compensation.

Background

Two disabled homeless men (Kim and Chae) were living in Mokpo and Seoul. An unregistered employment agency told them they could earn money by working on Sinan County's salt farms. Instead, they were sold to a farmer who owned a salt evaporation pond for a million won. Kim was trafficked in 2012, and Chae was trafficked in 2008.

They were forced to work unpaid on a salt evaporation pond in Sineuido, Sinan County. Kim and Chae were forced to work for 14 hours a day; if they did not work well, they were beaten with an iron bar or a wooden club.

Kim attempted to escape the island three times, but all his attempts failed. After his third attempt, Kim was threatened with death should he try again. Soon after, Kim sent a letter to his mother. His mother called the police in Seoul. After that, Kim and Chae were rescued by Seoul police on 6 February 2014. The owner and the unregistered employment agency were arrested by Seoul police. While Kim was reunited with his mother, Chae was not able to live with his family, so he entered a facility for handicapped people.

Most residents living in the islands and cities had helped the abusers to find the victims running away before this matter became an issue in South Korea. The residents included police officers who the victims were desperate to get assistance from.

After the rescue, Jeonnam Mokpo Police Station, Mokpo Branch of Gwangju Ministry of Labor of The Republic of Korea, and Sinan county investigated 140 salt farm workers at Sineuido (신의도), Jeungdo (증도), and Bigeumdo (비금도). The investigators searched all salt farms in Sinan county. The investigation found 18 workers who had not been paid among 140 salt farm workers, two of whom were handicapped. One worker had not been paid for ten years although he should have been paid at least 120,000,000 won.

There are more victims, and most involved in trafficking were sentenced to be jailed for few years with a stay of execution.

Response

Domestic 
Investigations by Korean authorities and independent journalists in 2013 and 2014 discovered around 163 salt farm employees, most of them mentally or physically disabled, who were being held and worked under slave-like conditions.  Around 50 island farm owners and regional job brokers were indicted or convicted of related crimes.  No government or police officials who were aware of the crimes have been indicted.

Seoul Guro Police Station 
Seoul Guro Police Station (part of the Seoul Metropolitan Police Agency) suggested a close investigation on the trafficking in South Korean remote islands.

President of South Korea 
President Park Geun-hye (박근혜) commented about the exploitation of workers in Sinan county. She said, "It should never happen in the twenty-first century; we need to root this kind of human trafficking out, so the National Police Agency and the Supreme Prosecutors' Office must investigate other remote islands to prevent human trafficking".

Deputy Speaker of Sinan County Council 
Park Yong-chan (박용찬), a party member of the New Politics Alliance for Democracy (새정치민주연합) and a deputy Speaker of Sinan county council (신안군 의회 부의장), was arrested by the Jeonnam police (전남지방경찰청) on 15 April 2014 for failure to pay three labourers who had worked on his salt evaporation pond, whom he should have paid a total of one hundred million won. He was also accused of beating his labourers.

Jeollanam-do 
On 22 February 2014, Jeollanam-do decided to resolve the exploitation of workers in the islands by promoting the workers' rights of salt evaporation pond labours.

Citizens in Sinan county 
After the farmer and the agency were arrested, Korean Broadcasting System (한국 방송 공사) interviewed citizens in Sinan county. One pond-owner's wife said, "We shouldn't give disabled people salaries because they would spend all salaries for buying alcoholic beverages". One citizen said, "In Sinan county, an honest person becomes a fool. The fifth-richest man owns the fifth most pond workers". A conscript police officer stated, "During my service period in Sinan county, even a local police inspector had disregarded handicapped people's human rights".

Internet 
Some South Korean internet sites such as Naver criticised both Sinan County and the local police. Based on Sinan County's geographical position, Ilbe Storehouse, a South Korean website criticised the Honam region.

References

External links 
 An interview of a rescued worker

2014 in South Korea
Human trafficking in South Korea
Human rights abuses in South Korea
Human rights abuses
Slavery in Korea